The suffix -bacter is in microbiology for many genera and is intended to mean "bacteria".

Meaning
Bacter is a new Latin (i.e. Modern Latin) term coined from bacterium, which in turn derives from the Greek βακτήριον, meaning small staff (diminutive of βακτηρία). Consequently, it formally means "rod".
It differs from the suffix -bacterium in grammatical gender, the former being male and the latter being neuter; this was decided in Juridical (or Judicial) Opinion n° 3 of the Bacteriological Code.

Nevertheless, for historical reasons, two archaeal species finish in -bacter: Methanobrevibacter and Methanothermobacter.

Usage

Juridical Opinion n° 2 in the Bacteriological Code discusses the declension of the word, given that authors differently assumed the genitive case of bacter to be bactris (3rd declension words of Latin origin ending in =ter), bacteri (2nd declension) or bacteris (3rd declension, used for words of Greek origin, such as astris).  The Opinion opts for the latter: consequently, higher taxa are formed with the stem =bacter- and not =bactr-. In Juridical Opinion n° 3 it was established to be masculine.
For example, Campylobacter is a genus of Campylobacterales.
These rules were established so that the specific epithets were paired with the correct gender as imposed by the Bacteriological Code and the correct higher taxon names were formed.
An interesting effect of this is that the genus Fibrobacter gives its name both to the phylum Fibrobacteres, which obeys Latin grammar, and to the class Fibrobacteria, which follows the recommendation of using the suffix -ia

Genera

See also
 -monas
 Bacteriological Code
 bacterial taxonomy has a discussion of endings of Bacterial phyla

References

bacter
Bacterial taxonomy
Biological nomenclature
English suffixes